York South was a provincial riding in Ontario, Canada, that was represented in the Legislative Assembly of Ontario from 1926 to 1999.

History
The provincial riding of York South first came into existence for the 1926 Ontario election. It was slightly smaller than the federal riding but covered much of the same area. For most of the period after World War II, it was a bastion of the Ontario CCF and its successor, the NDP, being the riding of three CCF/NDP leaders in the Ontario legislature, Ted Jolliffe, Donald C. MacDonald and Bob Rae.

When the government of Mike Harris changed Ontario's electoral law so that federal and provincial ridings matched, most of York South was merged into York South—Weston. Smaller portions of the old riding became parts of Parkdale—High Park and Davenport.

Members of Provincial Parliament

Election results

References

Notes

Citations

Former provincial electoral districts of Ontario
Provincial electoral districts of Toronto